Sercloremine (CGP-4718A), usually as the hydrochloride salt, is a drug which was developed in the 1980s and was formerly under investigation as an antidepressant, but was never marketed. It acts as a selective, reversible inhibitor of monoamine oxidase A (RIMA) and serotonin reuptake inhibitor.

References 

Reversible inhibitors of MAO-A
Antidepressants
Benzofurans
Piperidines
Chloroarenes
Serotonin reuptake inhibitors
Monoamine oxidase inhibitors